The Moharram (MGG-50) is a 6-barreled 12.7 mm (.50 caliber) This weapon can be used on land, in the air and at sea. Gatling gun that is mounted on pickup trucks, tanks, armored personnel carriers, helicopters, unmanned aerial vehicles, naval vessels, warships and frigates can be used to attack air, sea, and land targets. 

The advanced composite armor, which has been manufactured on the basis of shear-thickening fluid (STF) technology, enables the product to behave like a solid when it encounters mechanical stress. The home-made armor is even resistant to armor-piercing projectiles with steel core, and also meets the global standards of the military equipment.

The Islamic Revolutionary Guard Corps (IRGC) and the military are also trying to develop three rapid-fire Gatling guns – the three-barrel 23mm Assefeh and the six-barrel 7.62mm Akhgar and the 12.7mm Moharam and Nasir. cruise missiles down.

See also 

 List of frigates of Iran 
 List of military equipment manufactured in Iran

References 

 
Artillery of Iran